Nguyễn Phúc Trú, or Nguyễn Phúc Chú, (1696–1738; r. 1725–1738) was one of the Nguyễn lords who ruled over Đàng Trong (southern Vietnam) in the 16th–18th centuries. Also known as Ninh Vuong, he expanded his family's territory by seizing the Cambodian provinces of Vinh-long and My-tho in 1731.

References
Coedes, G. (1962). The Making of South-east Asia. London: Cox & Wyman Ltd. p213.

Tru
1696 births
1738 deaths